Fuente el Saz de Jarama is a municipality of the autonomous community of Madrid in central Spain. It belongs to the comarca of Cuenca del Medio Jarama.

Bus lines 
 Line 184: Madrid (Plaza de Castilla) - El Casar (Interbús)

 Line 197: Madrid (Plaza de Castilla) - Torrelaguna (ALSA)

 Line 254: Valdeolmos/Fuente el Saz - Alcalá de Henares (ALSA)

References 

Municipalities in the Community of Madrid